The Camp Saxton Site is a  property located in Port Royal, South Carolina. It was listed in the National Register Historic Places on February 2, 1995.

Location and History
Situated along the Beaufort River, it is bounded on the east by the river, on the west by the United States Naval Hospital Beaufort complex, on the north by the boat basin off the Beaufort River and on the south by the ruins of the Fort Frederick Heritage Preserve.
 
The site contains an intact portion of the U.S. Union Army camp occupied from early November 1862 to late January 1863 by the 1st South Carolina Volunteers. The camp was the site of the Emancipation Proclamation ceremonies on January 1, 1863.

In January 2017, the Camp Saxton Site became part of the newly created Reconstruction Era National Monument, established by President Barack Obama.

References

1862 establishments in South Carolina
African-American history of South Carolina
Archaeological sites on the National Register of Historic Places in South Carolina
British forts in the United States
Buildings and structures in Beaufort County, South Carolina
Colonial forts in South Carolina
Forts in South Carolina
Military facilities on the National Register of Historic Places in South Carolina
National Register of Historic Places in Beaufort County, South Carolina
South Carolina in the American Civil War